The 2022–23 season is the 122nd season in the history of FC Luzern and their 17th consecutive season in the top flight. The club are participating in Swiss Super League and Swiss Cup.

Players

Other players under contract

Out on loan

Transfers

In

Out

Pre-season and friendlies

Competitions

Overall record

Swiss Super League

League table

Results summary

Results by round

Matches 
The league fixtures were announced on 17 June 2022.

Swiss Cup

References

FC Luzern seasons
Luzern